Robert Johnson (c. 1470 – after 1554) was a Scottish Renaissance composer and priest.

Little is known of Johnson's early life, and it is believed much of his music has been lost. Most of his extant works are sacred compositions, chiefly motets. He also wrote some instrumental pieces. No secular works of his are known to have existed. Johnson spent 36 years at Scone Abbey in Perthshire, Scotland. He is widely considered Scotland's greatest composer prior to Robert Carver (c. 1485 – c. 1570). He is represented in The Mulliner Book as well as the Gyffard partbooks and Christ Church partbooks. The Dum transisset Sabbatum for 5 voices are in the Dow Partbooks.

Musical compositions
Domine In Virtute Tua I
Domine In Virtute Tua II
Dum Transisset Sabbatum for 4 voices
Dum Transisset Sabbatum for 5 voices
Gaude Maria Virgo
Ave Dei Patris Filia
Benedicam Domino
Laudes Deo
I Give You A New Commandment

Recordings
Laudes Deo: Cappella Nova conducted by Alan Tavener (ASV Records)

References
[1]HOASM: Robert Johnson (1) (http://www.hoasm.org/IVM/JohnsonR1.html)

Scottish composers
1470s births
16th-century deaths